Major League Baseball recognizes stolen base leaders in the American League and National League each season.

American League

National League

American Association

Federal League

Players' League

National Association

See also
List of Major League Baseball stolen base records
List of Major League Baseball career stolen bases leaders

References
Baseball-Reference.com

Stolen bases
Annual